HD 152010 is a solitary star in the southern circumpolar constellation Apus. It has an apparent magnitude of 6.48, placing it near the max visibility for the naked eye.

This A-type star has either luminosity class intermediate between a subgiant and a main sequence star. At present it has 2.2 times the mass of the Sun but has expanded to 10 times its diameter. There is a 12th magnitude companion star at an angular separation of  along a position angle of 162° (as of 2016).

References

External links
 Image HD 152010

Apus (constellation)
152010
Double stars
A-type main-sequence stars
082944
Durchmusterung objects
A-type subgiants